Magomed Ibragimov may refer to:
 Magomed Ibragimov (wrestler, born 1974), Russian naturalized Macedonian wrestler of Avar descent
 Magomed Ibragimov (wrestler, born 1983), Dagestani Uzbek wrestler
 Magomed Ibragimov (wrestler, born 1985), Russian-born naturalized Uzbekistani freestyle wrestler